Bala Mahalleh-ye Gafsheh (also Romanized as Bālā Maḩalleh-ye Gafsheh; also known as Bālā Gafsheh) is a village in Gafsheh-ye Lasht-e Nesha Rural District, Lasht-e Nesha District, Rasht County, Gilan Province, Iran. At the 2006 census, its population was 1,771, in 500 families.

References 

Populated places in Rasht County